The 1948 Eastern Illinois Panthers football team represented Eastern Illinois State College—now known as Eastern Illinois University—as a member of the Illinois Intercollegiate Athletic Conference (IIAC) during the 1948 college football season. Led by third-year head coach Maynard O'Brien, the Panthers finished the season with a 7–3 record overall and a 4–0 mark in conference play, winning the IIAC.

Schedule

References

Eastern Illinois
Eastern Illinois Panthers football seasons
Interstate Intercollegiate Athletic Conference football champion seasons
Eastern Illinois Panthers football